Finnish national road 7 is a highway in Finland. It runs from Erottaja in Helsinki to the Russian frontier at the Vaalimaa border crossing point in Virolahti. The road is also European route E18 and it is a part of TERN.

Route
The route of the road is Helsinki – Vantaa – Porvoo – Loviisa – Kotka – Hamina – Vaalimaa (Russian border). With the section of motorway between Loviisa and Kotka opened to traffic in September 2014, the route from Helsinki to Hamina is now a continuous motorway. After completion of the motorway section bypassing the town of Hamina, due in late 2014,  of the highway's total length of  will be motorway. There is a plan to extend the motorway from its current endpoint in Lelu, Hamina to Vaalimaa by 2018, finalizing the motorway link between Helsinki and the Russian border; construction is due to begin in late 2015.

Images

See also
 Itäväylä

External links

Matti Grönroos – Valtatie 7 
Queue situation at the Finnish/Russian border
Loviisa - Kotka project website
Hamina bypass project website
Hamina - Vaalimaa project website 

Roads in Finland